High pressure receptors are the baroreceptors  found within the aortic arch and carotid sinus. They are only sensitive to blood pressures above 60 mmHg. 

When these receptors are activated they elicit a depressor response; which decreases the heart rate and causes a general vasodilation. An increase in arterial blood pressure reflexively elicits an increase in vagal neuronal activity to the heart (i.e. the resulting decreased heart rate). 

The afferent nerves from the baroreceptors are called buffer nerves.

See also

 Low pressure receptors
 Bainbridge reflex

References

"Principles of medical physiology" by A Fonyo page 577

Sensory receptors